The governor of Leyte is the local chief executive of the Philippine province of Leyte.

List

References

Governors of Leyte (province)
Governors of provinces of the Philippines